In the 19th century there was one major battle fought in the vicinity of the town of Radzymin, a suburb of Warsaw:

 Battle of Radzymin (1809), a Polish-Austrian battle following the Battle of Raszyn (1809)

In the 20th century the following two major battles were fought in the vicinity of Radzymin:

 Battle of Radzymin (1920), a major clash and a part of the Battle of Warsaw during the Polish-Soviet War
 Battle of Radzymin (1944), a tank battle between Nazi Germany and Soviet Union during the opening stages of the Warsaw Uprising